Aveo Group is an Australian company, and a leading owner, operator and manager of over 90 retirement and aged care communities across Australia. The retirement communities are located in Queensland, New South Wales, SA, Victoria and Tasmania, and as of 2021, Aveo provides senior living choices for over 12,000 residents.

The head office is located in Sydney, with corporate offices in Brisbane and Melbourne. Aveo is owned by Brookfield Asset Management.

In November 2019 shareholders approved a takeover offer by Brookfield Asset Management Inc. and Aveo is delisted from the ASX.

Brisbane's first integrated retirement living community, Aveo Newstead, won the Nettletontribe Award for Design Award at the 2018 Property Council's Retirement Living Awards.

In 2017, a class action was lodged against Aveo for its resident contracts involving unconscionable conduct and misleading conduct. The class action attracted publicity when the lead lawyer was accused of misleading the residents and the law firm running the class action was ordered to remove their ads promoting the class action. It was the first-ever case where an amicus was appointed over an opt-out notice. The court-appointed barrister advised clients not to join the class action.

Aveo vigorously fought the allegations.

References

External links 
 

Real estate companies of Australia
Brookfield Asset Management